"Tempo" is a song by American singer and rapper Lizzo featuring American rapper Missy Elliott for her third studio album and major-label debut Cuz I Love You (2019). The song was originally released as a promotional single on March 20, 2019, before being released as the album's second single on July 26, 2019.

The single was written by the two artists with contributions from Antonio Cuna (a.k.a. Sweater Beats), Tobias Wincorn, Theron Thomas, Dan Farber, and Eric Frederic (a.k.a. Ricky Reed). The recording uses a sample from an electronic recording/composition entitled "Nescafé" by Raymond Scott (from his album Manhattan Research, Inc.), who is credited as a co-writer. Lizzo and Reed co-produced the track with Farber, Wincorn, Sweater Beats, and Nate Mercereau. Musically, "Tempo" is an R&B and trap song composed of a bass-heavy, woodwind-inspired beat. It contains lyrics about body positivity, and has been described by one music critic as an "ode to curvaceous women".

"Tempo" received positive reviews from music critics, who praised the artists' performances and deemed it a club track. Commercially, it entered several component charts in Belgium and the United States. The song was promoted by an accompanying music video, directed by Andy Hines. It was released on July 26, 2019, the same day as the single's official release.

Composition
"Tempo" is a "nostalgia-filled" R&B, trap, and funk-pop song with a length of two minutes and fifty five seconds. The song begins with a powerful guitar riff, before breaking into the song's chorus: "Slow songs, they for skinny hoes. Can't move all of this here to one of those". It contains a "bass-heavy" and woodwind-inspired beat, before closing with a flute solo. Elliott's verse was added to the track after Lizzo had heard the song's completed instrumental. Described as "fiery twerk-team anthem" by NPR, "Tempo" is an "ode to curvaceous women" containing "self-assured" and "feel good" lyrics, followed by Elliott's "curve-celebrating" verse in the bridge.

Critical reception
"Tempo" received positive reviews from music critics. Will Lavin, writing for NME, called the track "fierce" and "up-tempo". Brendan Wetmore of Paper praised the song as "the kind of track that you don't even have to try to dance to". He also labelled it "a song for the club". Joshua Bote, writing for NPR, reacted positively to the song, calling it "a track that flows freely with their combined confidence and mic skills". Mike Wass of Idolator called the song "an unrepentant banger". Ben Kaye, writing for Consequence of Sound, praised Elliott's verse, writing "the slapping '90s beat is perfect for Missy [Elliott]".

Accolades

Music video
Lizzo announced the song's music video on July 25, 2019. The video, directed by Andy Hines, was released on July 26, 2019. It features Lizzo, dressed in a blue coat and red cowboy hat, partying in a diner parking lot with several dancers and cars in the background. Missy Elliott jumps out of a car in a tracksuit to perform her verse. David Renshaw of The Fader called the video "joy-filled".

Track listing

Personnel
Adapted from Tidal.

Lizzo – lead artist, songwriter, producer, programmer
Missy Elliott – featured artist, songwriter, additional vocals
Ricky Reed – songwriter, producer, instruments, programmer
Shelbeniece Swain – additional vocals
Theron Thomas – songwriter, additional vocals
Dan Farber – songwriter, co-producer, programmer
Nate Mercereau – co-producer, programmer
Sweater Beats – co-producer, programmer
Antonio Cuna – songwriter
Raymond Scott – songwriter, recorded sample
Tobias Wincorn – songwriter, co-producer, programmer
Ethan Shumaker – additional vocals, engineer
Chris Gehringer – masterer
Manny Marroquin – mixer
Robin Florent – mixer
Scott Desmarais – mixer

Charts

Year-end charts

Certifications

Release history

Notes

References

2019 singles
2019 songs
Body image in popular culture
Funk songs
Lizzo songs
Missy Elliott songs
Songs written by Lizzo
Songs written by Missy Elliott
Songs written by Theron Thomas
Songs written by Ricky Reed